The West Australian Football League holds a grand final every year to determine the premiership winning team.

Last 10 WAFL Grand Finals 

The last ten WAFL Grand Finals have featured eight of the nine clubs (Perth last qualified for a Grand Final in 1978), and six of these eight clubs have won the premiership (East Fremantle and East Perth last won the premiership in 1998 and 2002 respectively).

See also

AFL Grand Final
SANFL Grand Final

References

External links

West Australian Football League